Stamatios (Tom) M. Krimizis (born September 10, 1938) is a Greek-American scientist in space exploration. He has contributed to many of the United States' unmanned space exploration programs of the Solar System and beyond. He has contributed to exploration missions to almost every planet of the Solar System. In 1999, the International Astronomical Union named the asteroid 8323 Krimigis (previously 1979 UH) in his honor.

Biography
He was born in 1938 in Vrontados of Chios, Greece, where he attended school. In the United States he studied at the University of Minnesota, and earned his Bachelor of Physics, 1961, his Master of Science at the University of Iowa in 1963 and his Ph.D. in 1965 in Physics. He was a student of James Van Allen.

He is Head Emeritus of the Space Department Applied Physics Laboratory at Johns Hopkins University Laurel, Maryland, United States and he is a member of Academy of Athens, Greece, where he has the Chair of Science of Space. He is also the President of the Greek National Council for Research and Technology.

Krimigis has been the Principal Investigator for MIMI on Cassini–Huygens, the Low Energy Charged Particle Experiment (LECP) on Voyager 1 and Voyager 2, and for the CPME on Explorer 47.

He is Co-Investigator for LAN/HI-SCALE on Ulysses solar polar orbiter, EPIC on GEOTAIL, EDP for Galileo mission, TRD on Mariner 3, and for the LECR on Mariner 4.
Krimigis has also worked on the Advanced Composition Explorer, the Mariner 5, MESSENGER and New Horizons programs.
 
Krimigis was featured in the 2017 documentary film The Farthest about the Voyager program.

Honors 
 Fellow, APS, AGU, AAAS, AIAA.
 Lifetime Achievement Award, Johns Hopkins Applied Physics Laboratory (2004).
 Member of the Academy of Athens, Chair of Science of Space (2004).
 COSPAR Space Science Award (2002).
 Smithsonian Institution Trophy (2002).
 Aviation Week and Space Technology Laurels in Space Award (1996, 2001).
 NASA Medal for Exceptional Scientific Achievement (1981, 1986).
 Basic Sciences Award, International Academy of Astronautics (1994).
 Council of European Aerospace Societies Gold Medal (2011).
 National Air and Space Museum Lifetime Achievement Trophy Award (2015).
 Hellenic Physical Society Award, for major contributions to science in Greece and abroad (11 May, 2015)
 American Astronomical Society Space Flight Award (2015).
 NASA Distinguished Public Service Medal (2016).
 Over 40 NASA and ESA Group Achievement Awards.

References

External links 
 Dr Krimigis at I.A.U.
 Brief Biography from NASA
 Info

1938 births
Living people
People from Chios
Planetary scientists
20th-century Greek astronomers
University of Minnesota College of Science and Engineering alumni
Voyager program
Members of the Academy of Athens (modern)
Johns Hopkins University faculty
Space scientists
University of Iowa alumni
NASA people
Fellows of the American Physical Society
20th-century Greek Americans